Castle Craig Hospital is a private residential drug and alcohol rehabilitation clinic. It is located in Peeblesshire, Scotland.

History
The estate is first recorded in 1170 when it was conferred, as part of the parish of Kirkurd, to Bishop Engelram of Glasgow by Pope Alexander III. The present Castle Craig was built in 1798 by Sir John Gibson-Carmichael (1773–1803), a relative of the Earl of Hyndford. In 1905 it was sold to James Mann, who commissioned Sir John James Burnet to remodel the house. It was in use as a residential school in the early 1970s.

The founders of the hospital, Peter McCann and Dr Margaret Ann McCann, first founded a treatment centre at Clouds House in Wiltshire, England, in 1983, before opening Castle Craig in 1988. Castle Craig is a category B listed building.

Services
Rehabilitation treatment at Castle Craig is based upon the 12-step abstinence-based model of care which recognises addiction as a disease and abstinence from all drugs is essential for long-lasting recovery. The medical programme at Castle Craig is led by Medical Director and Consultant Psychiatrist Professor Jonathan Chick, and provides detoxification from alcohol and drugs, medical treatment, 12 step therapy, cognitive behavioural therapy and complementary therapies. Castle Craig is a private residential rehab clinic and is also a provider of services to the National Health Service in the UK.

References

External links

Houses completed in 1798
Hospitals in the Scottish Borders
Country houses in the Scottish Borders
Category B listed buildings in the Scottish Borders
Listed hospital buildings in Scotland
Psychiatric hospitals in Scotland
Drug and alcohol rehabilitation centers
Addiction organisations in the United Kingdom